Rudy Markussen (born 24 July 1977), is a former Danish professional boxer who competed from 1997 to 2015. He challenged once for the IBF super middleweight title in 2002, and once for the interim WBA super middleweight title in 2012. At regional level, he held the WBO Inter-Continental super middleweight title from 2003 to 2004 and the EBU European super middleweight title in 2004.

In 2006, Markussen was in a car accident, which temporarily put a halt to his career. He made a comeback 4 years later, having 6 fights between 2010 and 2012 (5 wins, 1 loss) before having a 3 year break from the ring. Markussen returned in 2015 for 2 final fights before permanent retirement.

Career

Ottke fight 
After the other Dane Mads Larsen lost his fight to Sven Ottke, Markussen was demanded by the Danish media to win fight against the undefeated German. Two undefeated fighters - Ottke (28-0, 5 KO) and Markussen (27-0, 16 KO) - facing each other for the IBF Super Middleweight title. With Ottke's 15 title defenses, the Dane was on paper clearly the underdog. But Markussen showed he wanted the title, and many commentators and experts thought that Markussen deserved the win. All three judges scored the bout 116-112 in favor of Sven Ottke.

Switching from Mogens Palle to Team Sauerland 

After Markussen temporarily stopped his career after a car accident, he also criticized his promoter Mogens Palle for being selfish and destroying his career. Markussen meant that Mogens Palle didn't give him enough money. Both men have criticized each other in the media.

After Markussen made his comeback in 2010, he signed a contract with German Team Sauerland. with Sauerland featuring him in his last 2 fights on their Viasat Nordic Fight Night cards.

Magee fight 
In February 2012, Rudy was going to face the reigning WBA regular champion Brian Magee in Brøndby Hallen, Denmark. It was the same story as the Ottke-fight in 2002, that the other Dane Mads Larsen met the same man, but both Danes lost. This time Markussen had to take revenge for Mads Larsen against Brian Magee. It was the second time in his career the Dane was going into a World title-fight. The last time was in 2002 when he faced Sven Ottke for the IBF Super Middleweight title.Before the Magee fight, Markussen hadn't lost any fight since he temporarily stopped his career in 2006. But Magee changed all that in the fifth round with a punch to the liver. Markussen couldn't take that and was knocked out.

Professional boxing record

Discography
Featured in single
2010: "Hardhitter" (Kaliber featuring Rudy Markussen and Kurt Thyboe).

References 

1977 births
Living people
Danish male boxers
Sportspeople from Copenhagen
Super-middleweight boxers